Fulvio Varglien (also spelt Varljen; 3 January 1936 – 7 June 2021) was an Italian professional football player and coach.

Early life
Born in Fiume, Varglien moved to Trieste as a refugee in 1947, aged 11. His father had died in World War II.

Career
He played football for Triestina (initially combining his playing career with his job on the railways), Livorno and Torino, and later worked as a coach.

References

1936 births
2021 deaths
Footballers from Rijeka
Italians of Croatia
Italian footballers
Association football midfielders
U.S. Triestina Calcio 1918 players
U.S. Livorno 1915 players
Torino F.C. players
Serie A players
Serie B players